Albaugh is a surname of Austrian origin. It is an anglicized variation of the German language surname Albach. The American descendants of Austrian immigrants changed the name to Albaugh in the late 19th or early 20th century.

Notable people with the surname include:
Dennis Albaugh (born 1949/50), American billionaire, founder and chairman of Albaugh LLC
James Albaugh (born 1950), American businessman; executive vice president of Boeing Aircraft
John Albaugh (contemporary), American congressional staffer convicted in the Jack Abramoff affair
John W. Albaugh (1837–1909), American stage actor
Walter H. Albaugh (1890–1942), American politician from Ohio; U.S. representative 1938–39